John Allen (born November 1, 1982) is an American professional basketball player.

College career
Allen hails from Coatesville, Pennsylvania, and played college basketball at Seton Hall University from 2001–2005. Allen is currently 15th all time in Seton Hall scoring (1,466), while averaging 12.3 points per game. Allen is also 4th all time in minutes played (3,821) and 6th all time in career starts (111) at Seton Hall University.

Awards
2000 & 2001 All-State Pennsylvania
2001 Parade Magazine 2nd Team All-American
2001 McDonald's All-American Honorable Mention
2001 USA Today 3rd Team All USA
2001 SLAM Magazine All-American Honorable Mention
2001 EA Sports Roundball Classic (leading scorer)
2002 All Big East Rookie Team
2003 Metropolitan 2nd Team
2005 USBL Rookie of the Year

Achievements
Coatesville (PA) High School's All Time Leading Scorer (2,372)surpassing Detroit Pistons great Richard Hamilton (basketball).
Averaged 26 points per game as senior, leading Coatesville to State Class AAAA Title.
Scored 29 points for East in 2001 EA Sports Roundball Classic All-American Game.

References

External links
 The Setonian: On track from South Orange to Finland.
 John Allen is represented by Court-Side Global Management and Representation (www.court-side.com)
 SLAM Online: Where are they at?

1982 births
Living people
American expatriate basketball people in Finland
American expatriate basketball people in France
American expatriate basketball people in Germany
American expatriate basketball people in Israel
American expatriate basketball people in Poland
American expatriate basketball people in the Dominican Republic
Basketball Löwen Braunschweig players
Basketball players from Pennsylvania
Eisbären Bremerhaven players
Ironi Ramat Gan players
Israeli Basketball Premier League players
Kauhajoen Karhu players
KK Włocławek players
Parade High School All-Americans (boys' basketball)
People from Coatesville, Pennsylvania
Seton Hall Pirates men's basketball players
Shooting guards
Sportspeople from Chester County, Pennsylvania
American men's basketball players
United States Basketball League players